Matada Patil Prakash (11 July 19409 February 2011),  was an Indian politician, film actor, director who was the Deputy Chief Minister of Karnataka from 2005 to 2006.  Prakash was also a theatre enthusiast. He directed and acted in Kannada plays. He died on 9 February 2011 in Bangalore at the age of 71.

Career
Born on 11 July 1940 at Vallabhapura in Hagari Bommanahalli taluk, Bellary District, Prakash was an advocate by profession. He was elected to the Legislative Assembly four times. He first entered the Assembly from Hadagali in 1983 on the Janata Party ticket and was re-elected thrice. He served as a minister handling various portfolios in all the Janata governments under various Chief ministers such as Ramakrishna Hegde, S.R.Bommai, H. D. Deve Gowda, J.H.Patel, Dharam Singh and H.D.Kumaraswamy. He was the deputy chief minister in the Congress-Janata Dal-Secular coalition for a brief while during 2005–06.

Death
He died on 9 February 2011 due to cancer in a private hospital at Bangalore. His funeral took place at Hadagali, his home town in Bellary and was attended by thousands of people.

References

External links
 MP Prakash Passed away

1940 births
2011 deaths
Deputy Chief Ministers of Karnataka
People from Bellary district
Janata Party politicians
Indian National Congress politicians
Janata Dal politicians
Janata Dal (United) politicians
Janata Dal (Secular) politicians